"God Save the Queen" is the national anthem of the United Kingdom and the royal anthem of Commonwealth realms (Canada, Australia, etc.) and various territories, when there is a female monarch.

God Save the Queen may also refer to:
"God Save the Queen" (Sex Pistols song), song by the Sex Pistols released as a single in 1977
"God Save the Queen" (Queen song), instrumental version by Queen released on the album A Night at the Opera in 1975
God Save the Queen (comics), a 96-page comic series published in 2007 by Vertigo DC Comics
God Save the Queen/Under Heavy Manners, an album by Robert Fripp released in 1980
God Save the Queen (band), an Argentine band from Rosario, tribute to the band Queen

See also
 God Save the King (disambiguation)